was the pen name of , an early Shōwa period Japanese author, Zen priest, post office director and sub-lieutenant. The pen name roughly means "a person who always dreams". He wrote detective novels and is known for his avant-gardism and his surrealistic, wildly imaginative and fantastic, even bizarre narratives. His eldest son, Sugiyama Tatsumaru, was known as the Green Father of India for spending billions of yen on reforestation.

Early life
Yumeno was born in Fukuoka city, Fukuoka prefecture as Sugiyama Naoki. His father, Sugiyama Shigemaru, was a major figure in the pre-war ultranationalist organization, the Genyōsha. After graduating from Shuyukan he attended the Literature Department at Keio University, but dropped out on orders from his father, and returned home to take care of the family farm. In 1926 he decided to become a Buddhist priest, but after a couple of years in the monastery, he returned home again as Sugiyama Yasumichi. By this time, he had developed a strong interest in the traditional Japanese drama form of Noh, with its genre of ghost stories and supernatural events. He found employment as a freelance reporter for the Kyushu Nippō newspaper (which later became the Nishinippon Shimbun), while writing works of fiction on the side.

Literary career
Kyūsaku's first success was a nursery tale Shiraga Kozō (White Hair Boy, 1922), which was largely ignored by the public. It was not until his first novella, Ayakashi no Tsuzumi (The Spirit Drum, 1924) in the literary magazine Shin-Seinen, that his name became known.

His subsequent works include Binzume jigoku (Hell in the Bottles, 1928), Kori no hate (End of the Ice, 1933), and his most significant novel Dogura Magura (Dogra Magra, 1935), which is considered a precursor of modern Japanese science fiction and was adapted for a 1988 movie directed by Toshio Matsumoto and starring Shijaku Katsura II, Hideo Murota, and Yōji Matsuda.

Dogra Magra exemplifies modern Japanese avant-garde gothic literature. In the story, the protagonist/narrator wakes up in a hospital with amnesia. He finds out that he was the subject of an experiment by a now-dead psychiatrist, and the doctors are working to bring back his memories. It is not clear whether he was a psychotic killer or the victim of a strange psychological experiment, but it is told that he killed his mother and wife and that he inherited his psychotic tendencies from an insane ancestor. The novel is strongly influenced by Freudian psychoanalysis and, through Yumeno's contacts there, provides considerable historical insight into the development of the study of psychoanalysis at Kyushu Imperial University.

Kyūsaku died of a cerebral hemorrhage in 1936 while talking with a visitor at home.

Works in translation

English translation
Short stories
 "Love After Death" (original title: Shigo no Koi) (Modanizumu: Modernist Fiction from Japan, 1913-1938, University of Hawaii Press, 2008)
 "Hell in a Bottle" (original title: Binzume Jigoku) (Three-Dimensional Reading: Stories of Time and Space in Japanese Modernist Fiction, 1911-1932, University of Hawaii Press, 2013)
 "Hell in Bottles" (original title: Binzume Jigoku) (The Nashville Review, Volume 25, Vanderbilt University, 2018)
 "Building" (original title: Birudingu) (The Literary Review, Volume 60 No 2: Physics, Farleigh Dickinson University, 2017)

Novel
 "The Spirit Drum" (original title: Ayakashi no Tsuzumi) (Arigatai Books, 2019, translated by J.D. Wisgo)
 "Kaimu: A Collection of Disturbing Dreams" (original title: Kaimu) (Arigatai Books, 2021, translated by J.D. Wisgo)

Essay
 "Terrifying Tokyo" (Tokyo stories: a literary stroll, University of California Press, 2002)

French translation
Novel
 "Dogra Magra" Philippe Picquier (2003). 

Spanish translation
Short stories
 .

Polish translation
Short stories

 "Piekło w butelkach" (original title: Binzume Jigoku) (Tajfuny, 2021, translated by Andrzej Świrkowski)

Novel

 "Przeklęty bębenek" (original title: Ayakashi no tsuzumi) (Kirin, 2021, translated by Anna Grajny)

Russian translation
Novel
 Догра Магра (original title: Dogura Magura) (Издательство книжного магазина «Желтый двор», 2021, translated by Anna Slashcheva) 

 References 

Further reading
 Yumeno, Kyūsaku. Nippon Tantei Shosetsu Zenshu (The Great Detective Stories of Japan) Vol. 4. Tokyo SogenSha (1984).  
 Bush, Laurence. Asian Horror Encyclopedia: Asian Horror Culture in Literature, Manga, and Folklore. Writer's Club Press (2001).  
 Napier, Susan J. The Fantastic in Modern Japanese Literature. Routledge (1995).  
 Clerici, Nathen. Dreams from Below: Yumeno Kyūsaku and Subculture Literature in Japan'' (2013)

External links 
 
 
 J'Lit | Authors : Kyusaku Yumeno | Books from Japan 
 e-texts of Kyūsaku's works at Aozora Bunko

1889 births
1936 deaths
Japanese male short story writers
Japanese horror writers
Japanese mystery writers
20th-century Japanese novelists
People from Fukuoka
20th-century Japanese short story writers
20th-century Japanese male writers
20th-century Buddhists
Japanese Buddhists